Upaharam may refer to:

 Upaharam (1972 film), a Malayalam-language film directed by S Roy
 Upaharam (1985 film), a Malayalam-language film directed by Sajan